Stichaster striatus, the common light striated star, is a species of starfish in the family Stichasteridae, found in the southeastern Pacific Ocean. It was first described by the German zoologists Johannes Peter Müller and Franz Hermann Troschel in 1840.

Distribution and habitat 
Stichaster striatus is native to the southeastern Pacific Ocean, along the coast of South America.

Ecology 
This starfish is gregarious and a predator. Although it has been recorded in Chile as feeding on twenty-eight different species of invertebrate, the majority of these were sessile organisms. It was not found to engage in cannibalism of its own species or to feed on other species of starfish. Many individuals were found to have missing or regenerating arms. This is likely the result of attacks by the dominant predatory starfish in the region Meyenaster gelatinosus and Luidia magellanica. Starfish with missing arms are likely to have a certain minimum size; this is because, if they are too small, they are entirely devoured by the predator which attacked them. Juvenile S. striatus are found among the holdfasts of the kelp Lessonia nigrescens or hiding in crevices or under boulders.

Research 
It has been found that an aqueous extract of S. striatus, when fed to rats with a genetic disposition to consume alcohol to excess, reduced their voluntary intake of alcohol. This line of research was inspired by an oral tradition that Jesuit property-owners in South America in the 17th and 18th century fed "starfish soup" to their workers to encourage sobriety.

References 

Stichasteridae
Animals described in 1840
Taxa named by Johannes Peter Müller
Taxa named by Franz Hermann Troschel
Fauna of the Pacific Ocean